is a PS2, PSP, and PC game, developed by Kogado Studio. This game is part of the Deep-Blue series along with the sequel,  and Akatsuki no Amaneka to Aoi Kyojin. The story has been adapted into an OVA, and has been released with a title of "發明工坊" in China, Hong Kong, Taiwan, U.S.A., Russia, and Poland.

For the 10th anniversary celebration, this game was re-released on the PSP on August 9, 2012.

The opening and ending theme song of the game is "UP TO ME!!" by Sakura Nogawa, who voices the character of Nene Hampden.

Gameplay
Tristia of the Deep-Blue Sea is a simulation game in which the player's goal is to rebuild the city of Tristia. The player takes the role of Nanoca Flanka and must build an array of technological gadgets using schematics and various raw materials that can be encountered in-game, and sell them to people of Tristia. As new gadgets are introduced to the town, the town is able to produce a greater variety of items and gradually grows.

Plot
Tristia was a beautiful seaside town that slowly fell into ruin and dilapidation after being invaded by a dragon ten years before the start of the game. The people of the town tried in vain to rebuild the city in the hopes of restoring it to its former glory. Hopeless, the people decided to send for Prospero Flanca, a legendary inventor who was well known for reviving many dying cities. They received an answer from Prospero, but to their confusion, it was a girl who arrived at the port of the town. That girl was Nanoca, Prospero's granddaughter, and she has been assigned to manage the renovation project.

Characters

The 14-year-old protagonist of Tristia and the player's character. She is  the granddaughter of the renowned inventor Prospero Flanca. Prospero's name was well-known all over the world as an inventor and builder, and she is keen to uphold the name. She came from the Imperial Capital with Stuka, an artificial creature, and Tenzan, a mech-styled golem.

The young chairperson of the Carat Firm. She is fifteen years old, and is known as an unyielding and carefree person. She has been into many troubles since Nanoca came to town.

A rich girl, 12 years old and classmate of Nanoca in the Imperial Capital Youth Academy. She came from the Hampden clan, a wealthy capitalist family from the capital. Nene adores Nanoca very much, and is the one who recommended Nanoca to the town for the mission.

The mysterious girl who was found in a casket recovered from the sea in the vicinity of Tristia. Nothing much is known about her.

Nanoca's watchdog and support.

A golem under the command of Nanoca. It is shaped like a mech.

The head priest in the Ryunant temple in the city of Tristia. She noticed the talent of Nanoca upon her arrival.

Deputy Mayor of Tristia and a childhood friend of Reygurett.

Mayor of Tristia. His name is almost certainly derived from the name of New York's former Mayor, Rudy Giuliani.

Imperial multi-millionaire that lends his financial support for the revival project in Tristia.

OVA and manga character. Self-proclaimed rival of Nanoca since their years at the academy, always coming in second to Nanoca in every competition.

External links
 
 
 
 
 

2002 Japanese novels
2004 anime OVAs
2005 Japanese novels
Bishōjo games
Dengeki Bunko
Dengeki Daioh
Manga based on video games
Nippon Ichi Software games
PlayStation 2 games
PlayStation Portable games
Shōnen manga
Ufotable
Video games developed in Japan
Video games featuring female protagonists
Visual novels
Windows games